Isabel Stillman Rockefeller (June 23, 1902 – March 23, 1980) was a member of the Rockefeller family.

Early life and education
Isabel was born on June 23, 1902 to Percy Avery Rockefeller (1878–1934) and Isabel Goodrich Stillman. Percy Rockefeller, a financier and industrialist, was the son of Standard Oil co-founder William Avery Rockefeller Jr. (1841–1922) and his wife, Almira Geraldine Rockefeller. He was also a nephew of Standard Oil co-founder John Davison Rockefeller. Isabel Stillman was the daughter of James Jewett Stillman (1850–1918), a banker, and Sarah Elizabeth Rumrill. Together Percy and Isabel had five children:
Isabel Stillman Rockefeller (1902–1980)
Avery Rockefeller (1903–1986)
Winifred Rockefeller (1904–1951)
Faith Rockefeller (1909–1960)
Gladys Rockefeller (1910–1988)
She attended Westover School and was a member of Junior League, of which she took an active part. She became a member of the advisory board and helped produce a play called Ready Made. She also performed singing and dancing numbers. She studied bacteriology at Columbia University for three years, and then went to Europe for 5 months with her mother. She was a frequent face in New York City high society after her introduction as a debutante in 1920.

Lincoln was a member of the board of trustees St. Luke's–Roosevelt Hospital Center (Mount Sinai Morningside as of 2020) from 1956 until her death in 1980.

Personal life
In June 1925, it was announced that she would marry Frederic W. Lincoln IV. Her double cousin William Avery Rockefeller III (1896–1973) was married to a sister of Frederic.  The day before Isabel's marriage to Mr. Lincoln, a large party was held in their honor by William Avery Rockefeller III. The wedding was held on September 26, 1925 at Christ Episcopal Church in Greenwich, Connecticut by Rev. John Lewis. The day after the wedding, the newlyweds were again honored at a large function at the Field Club of Greenwich. A week-long honeymoon in Buenos Aires followed in November. Isabel and Frederic had four daughters:
Isabel Lincoln (1927–2016), who married Basil B. Elmer in 1951
Calista Lincoln (1930–2012), who married Henry U. Harder in 1952
Percy Lincoln, who married William B. Chappell
Florence Lincoln, who married Thomas L. Short
Lincoln died on March 23, 1980.

See also
Rockefeller family

References

1902 births
1980 deaths
Columbia University alumni
Rockefeller family
American socialites